This article lists the squads for the 2022 AFC Women's Asian Cup, the 20th edition of the AFC Women's Asian Cup. The tournament is a quadrennial women's international football tournament for national teams in Asia organised by the Asian Football Confederation, and was held in India from 20 January to 6 February 2022. In the tournament there were twelve national teams involved. Each national team registered a squad of 23 players.

The age listed for each player was on 20 January 2022, the first day of the tournament. The numbers of caps and goals listed for each player did not include any matches played after the start of tournament. The club listed is the club for which the player last played a competitive match prior to the tournament. The nationality for each club reflects the national association (not the league) to which the club is affiliated. A flag is included for coaches that are of a different nationality than their own national team.

Group A

China PR
Coach: Shui Qingxia

The final squad was announced on 11 January 2022.

Chinese Taipei
Coach:  Kazuo Echigo

The final squad was announced on 12 January 2022.

India
Coach:  Thomas Dennerby

The final squad was announced on 11 January 2022.

Iran
Coach: Maryam Irandoost

The final squad was announced on 12 January 2022.

Group B

Australia
Coach:  Tony Gustavsson

An initial 21-player squad was announced on 8 January 2022, along with four players who joined the travelling squad out of which two would be selected for the final squad. At the end of the pre-tournament training camp, Holly McNamara and Cortnee Vine were added to the final squad.

Indonesia
Coach: Rudy Eka Priyambada

The final squad was announced on 11 January 2022.

Philippines
Coach:  Alen Stajcic

The final squad was announced on 11 January 2022.

Thailand
Coach:  Miyo Okamoto

The final squad was announced on 12 January 2022.

Group C

Japan
Coach: Futoshi Ikeda

The final squad was announced on 7 January 2022.

Myanmar
Coach: Tin Myint Aung

The final squad was announced on 13 January 2022.

South Korea
Coach:  Colin Bell

The final squad was announced on 10 January 2022.

Vietnam
Coach: Mai Đức Chung

The final squad was announced on 5 January 2022.

Player representation
Statistics are per the beginning of the competition.

By club
Clubs with 5 or more players represented are listed.

By club nationality

By club federation

By representatives of domestic league

References

squads
2022